Bradford Timothy Davis (born February 9, 1953) is a former American football player who played professionally as a running back in the National Football League (NFL) for the Atlanta Falcons for two seasons.

Davis was born in Hammond, Louisiana and attended Hammond Magnet High School. He attended college at Louisiana State University, where he played college football for the LSU Tigers football team. He rushed for 2,253 yards on 472 carries in his college career, and had 16 rushing and two receiving touchdowns. He was named to the 1973 All-SEC team as a first-team selection by the United Press and second-team by the Associated Press after rushing for 904 yards and scoring seven total touchdowns during the season.

References

living people
1953 births
Sportspeople from Hammond, Louisiana
Hammond High School (Louisiana) alumni
LSU Tigers football players
Atlanta Falcons players
players of American football from Louisiana
American football running backs